Lone Mathiesen (born 28 January 1972) is a former Danish team handball player and World champion. She was part of the team that won the 1997 World Championship.

External links
Profile at eurohandball.com 

1972 births
Living people
Danish female handball players
Place of birth missing (living people)